NGC 496, also occasionally referred to as PGC 5037, UGC 927 or GC 288, is a spiral galaxy in the constellation Pisces. It is located approximately 250 million light-years from the Solar System and was discovered on 12 September, 1784 by astronomer William Herschel.

Observation history 
The object was discovered by Herschel along with NGC 495 and NGC 499. He initially described the discovery as "Three [NGC 496 along with NGC 495 and 499], eS and F, forming a triangle.". As he observed the trio again the next night, he was able to make out more detail: "Three, forming a [right triangle]; the [right angle] to the south NGC 499, the short leg preceding [NGC 496], the long towards the north [NGC 495]. Those in the legs [NGC 496 and 495] the faintest imaginable; that at the rectangle [NGC 499] a deal larger and brighter, but still very faint."

NGC 496 was later also observed by Bindon Blood Stoney. This position is also noted in the New General Catalogue.

See also 
 Spiral Galaxy 
 List of NGC objects (1–1000)
 Pisces (constellation)

References

External links 

 
 SEDS

Spiral galaxies
Pisces (constellation)
0496
005061
Astronomical objects discovered in 1784
Discoveries by William Herschel
927